Victoria University was an English federal university established by royal charter on 20 April 1880 at Manchester. It was the fifth university founded in England, established as a university for the North of England open to affiliation by colleges such as Owens College, which immediately did so. University College Liverpool joined the university in 1884, followed by Yorkshire College, Leeds, in 1887. The university and the colleges were distinct corporate bodies until Owens College merged with the university in 1904. A supplemental charter of 1883 enabled the granting of degrees in medicine and surgery.

History

The aspirations of Manchester and Liverpool to become independent city universities meant that the Victoria University was short-lived. Liverpool left the university in 1903 to become the University of Liverpool; Leeds was granted its own royal charter in 1904 and became the University of Leeds; Manchester, the only remaining site, was granted a new royal charter as the Victoria University of Manchester.

There was also a proposal that York be included: in 1903, F. J. Munby and others (including the Yorkshire Philosophical Society) proposed a 'Victoria University of Yorkshire'. See University of York.

List of Colleges

Student Life

The Christie Cup is an inter-university competition between Liverpool, Leeds and Manchester in numerous sports since 1886. After the Oxford and Cambridge rivalry, the Christie's Championships is the oldest inter–university competition on the English sporting calendar. The cup was a benefaction of Richard Copley Christie, a professor at Owens College.

Officers

Vice-Chancellors
1880–1887: Joseph Gouge Greenwood (also Principal of Owens College 1857–1889)
1887–1891: Adolphus William Ward (also Principal of Owens College 1889–1897)
1891–1895: Gerald Henry Rendall (University College, Liverpool)
1895–1897: Adolphus William Ward (second term)
1897–1901: Nathan Bodington (Yorkshire College, Leeds)
1901–1903: Alfred Hopkinson (also Principal of Owens College 1898–1904; afterwards Vice-Chancellor of the Victoria University of Manchester until 1913)

Chancellors
1880–1891: The 7th Duke of Devonshire
1892–1904: The 6th Earl Spencer, afterwards Chancellor of the Victoria University of Manchester.

Arms

The armorial bearings of the Victoria University showed charges representative of the three colleges: Per pale argent and gules, a rose counterchanged, in dexter chief a terrestrial globe semée of bees Or, in sinister chief a fleece Or, in point a liverbird rising argent, beaked and membered gules holding in the beak a fish argent with the motto Olim armis nunc studiis ('Formerly by weapons, now by studies'). The globe and bees is for Manchester, the liver bird for Liverpool, the fleece for Yorkshire and the rose for the counties of Lancaster (red rose) and York (white rose). The arms fell into abeyance in 1904 when those of Owens College were adopted for the Victoria University of Manchester.

See also
Red brick university
List of split up universities
Collegiate University

References

History of Liverpool
History of Leeds
Defunct universities and colleges in England
University of Leeds
University of Liverpool
University of Manchester
History of Manchester
1880 establishments in England